Emozamia is a genus of sea snails, marine gastropod mollusks in the subfamily Coralliophilinae, the coral snails, within the family Muricidae, the murex snails and rock snails.

Species
Species within the genus Emozamia include:
 Emozamia licinus

References

 
Coralliophilinae